George Carl "Cash" Carlson (December 20, 1897 – April 1, 1953) was an American football coach. he served as the head football coach at Bethany College in Lindsborg, Kansas for seven seasons, from 1927 to 1933, compiling a record of 21–29–7.

Death
Carlson died suddenly in 1953 at his home in Colorado, where he had moved seven years prior. He was survived by his wife, Helen Church, two daughters and two sons.

Head coaching record

References

External links
 

1897 births
1953 deaths
Bethany Swedes football coaches
People from Lindsborg, Kansas